Clarksdale High School (CHS) is the public high school of Clarksdale, Mississippi and a part of the Clarksdale Municipal School District.

History
Around the time of racial integration, circa the 1960s, there had been plans to build a new consolidated Clarksdale-Coahoma County High School to serve all children in Coahoma County; plans were abandoned, even though the building was already constructed, because the officials wanted to maintain segregation in a de facto manner.

After Clarksdale High integrated racially (sometime around 1970) the school administration refused to allow students to do a black history week, a frequent practice at schools for black people. As a result, 80 students walked out of classes in protest.

Extracurricular activities
In the early 20th century the school band, organized by Simon Kooyman, won Mississippi state championships and was named a Goodwill Ambassador to the city.

See also
Coahoma County Junior-Senior High School
Coahoma Early College High School
Lee Academy

References

External links
 
 

Schools in Coahoma County, Mississippi
Public high schools in Mississippi
Clarksdale, Mississippi